The 1994 Tasmanian International was a tennis tournament played on outdoor hard courts at the Domain Tennis Centre in Hobart in Australia that was part of Tier IV of the 1994 WTA Tour. It was the inaugural edition of the tournament and was held from 10 January through 15 January 1994. Sixth-seeded Mana Endo won the singles title and earned $18,000 first-prize money.

Finals

Singles

 Mana Endo defeated  Rachel McQuillan 6–1, 6–7(1–7), 6–4
 It was Endo's only WTA title of her career.

Doubles

 Linda Harvey-Wild /  Chanda Rubin defeated  Jenny Byrne /  Rachel McQuillan 7–5, 4–6, 7–6(7–1)
 It was Harvey-Wild's 1st title of the year and the 3rd of her career. It was Rubin's only title of the year and the 2nd of her career.

External links
 ITF tournament edition details
 Tournament draws

 
Tasmanian International
Tas
Hobart International